The Fox Cubhouse is an American preschool children's television series that aired weekday mornings on Fox Kids from 1994 through 1996. It ran for 234 episodes within two seasons. The show was an anthology series comprising several children's series. Initially starting with only Jim Henson's Animal Show, Johnson and Friends, and Rimba's Island, a different series was shown every day of the week.

Programs
 Jim Henson's Animal Show - 39 episodes, Jim Henson Productions (1994–1996) - broadcast on Mondays and Fridays
 Johnson and Friends - 78 episodes, Film Australia (US dub) (1994–1996) - broadcast on Tuesdays and Thursdays
 Rimba's Island - 52 episodes, DIC Productions, L.P. (1994–1996) - broadcast on Wednesdays
Britt Allcroft's Magic Adventures of Mumfie - 13 episodes, the Britt Allcroft Company (1995–1996) broadcast on Tuesdays with Johnson and Friends
 Budgie the Little Helicopter - 26 episodes, Fred Wolf Films (1995–1996) - broadcast on Thursdays with Johnson and Friends

Production history
In 1992, Jay Rayvid and Donna Mitroff of WQED in Pittsburgh (the PBS member station known for producing Mister Rogers' Neighborhood) entered into an agreement with Film Australia to attempt to get Johnson and Friends onto television in the United States, specifically PBS. Unfortunately, they were not able to secure funding from PBS to produce a pilot due to the sheer traffic and number of submissions, despite their interest. In 1994, though, FOX began to show interest in Johnson and Friends. At this stage, 26 episodes  (the first two series) had been produced and the latter 26 episodes (series three) were in post-production - all 52 episodes were available to WQED for distribution. FOX Children's Network committed to Johnson and Friends, thus The Fox Cubhouse was created.

WQED and Fox teamed up and implemented Johnson and Friends, Rimba's Island, and Jim Henson's Animal Show into this concept. The latter two series were specifically produced for the Cubhouse, but were also shown independently in many other countries. In addition, the Fox Cubhouse itself was shot at WQED.

The series featured a woman named Rosie (played by Nancy Mura), who with several puppet animal characters, introduced and served as the exit for the programs within. 

Johnson and Friends was heavily revised for the Cubhouse series, the voices were redubbed for the most part, but  Peter Browne was retained as Alfred's voice actor; due to master recording issues, however, all of his dialogue had to be rerecorded. Several additional songs and music tracks were written by Chris Neal and his son Braedy, who had previously composed all of the music for the original version of Johnson and Friends, as FOX felt that some of the earlier episodes were "too quiet" and did not fit the atmosphere they wanted for the series. Instrumental versions of pre-existing Johnson songs were also used. As the series was broadcast as a segment rather than a standalone program, the credits were featured at the end of the Cubhouse itself, and each Johnson episode ended with the final chorus of "Toys, Toys, Wonderful Toys" from the Johnson album, re-recorded by the US cast. Minor cuts were also occasionally made, along with adjustments to John Patterson's scripts, by WQED executive Casey Brown, to remove Australian terminology and slang. These changes are generally frowned upon by many of the original Johnson and Cubhouse crew, as well as people who grew up with the series.

The Fox Cubhouse became a short-lived success, and FOX commissioned an additional season of 26 episodes of Johnson and Friends for the Cubhouse's second season. Series director Ian Munro maintained a level of creative control over the American version of the program and was involved with voice direction for this run of episodes. These episodes were also shown in Australia, dubbed by the original voice cast and marketed as the fourth series of the program, two years after production, in 1997. David Flick, who had provided the American voice of Diesel, was replaced by Doug Scroope, Diesel's original voice, and several episodes of the first season of Cubhouse were also revised with Doug Scroope as Diesel, this change was actually present in late reruns of the first season of Cubhouse.  New episodes of Jim Henson's Animal Show and Rimba's Island were also present in this second season, as well as repeats of the old episodes. However, the second season was a complete revamp and the characters, setting, and the entire premise were changed. Only the programs within the Cubhouse remained the same. Two new shows, Magic Adventures of Mumfie and Budgie the Little Helicopter were also added to the series. While previous Cubhouse episodes featured two episodes of Johnson and Friends, the second season sometimes paired a single episode with an episode of Budgie the Little Helicopter or Magic Adventures of Mumfie (because all three programs had a running time of 10 minutes). Some episodes, however, still featured two Johnson episodes.

Shortly after the broadcast of the final second-season episodes in 1996, The Fox Cubhouse was taken off the air, and the American localisation has not been seen since. Many of the master tapes of the US version are thought to have been wiped, but several master copies are known to exist.

The Fox Cubhouse was also shown in the US overseas territory Guam on KTGM.

Characters

Season one 
 Rosie (Nancy Mura)
 Cammy the Fox (Melissa Polakovic)
 Silbert the Dinosaur (Don Kinney)
 Fogel the Bird (Dreux Priore)
 Mailvin the Mailbox (Bill Schiffbauer)

Season two 
 Sunny (Ellaraino Edwards)
 Freddie the Fox (Wendy Polland)
 Bill the Sunflower

List of episodes

Season one
101 - The Race (Jim Henson's Animal Show)
102 - Friends (No. 1) (Johnson and Friends)
103 - Fruit Punch (Rimba's Island)
104 - Together, We Can Do Anything (No. 1) (Johnson and Friends)
105 - Cammyflage (Jim Henson's Animal Show)
106 - The Letter (Jim Henson's Animal Show)
107 - Taking Turns (Johnson and Friends)
108 - Snoring (Rimba's Island)
109 - Big Trouble (Johnson and Friends)
110 - Let’s Get Some Sleep (No. 1) (Jim Henson's Animal Show)
111 - We Are Animals Too (Jim Henson's Animal Show)
112 - I Need a Little Help (Johnson and Friends)
113 - Tea Party (Rimba's Island)
114 - Clean Up (Johnson and Friends)
115 - Cows (Jim Henson's Animal Show)
116 - Painting (Jim Henson's Animal Show)
117 - Home is Where You Live (Johnson and Friends)
118 - I’m Learning Every Day (Rimba's Island)
119 - Hurt Teddy (Johnson and Friends)
120 - The North Star (Jim Henson's Animal Show)
121 - Camping Trip (Jim Henson's Animal Show)
122 - Mailvin Raps (Johnson and Friends)
123 - Fogel’s Music (Rimba's Island)
124 - Make Believe (No. 1) (Johnson and Friends)
125 - Hop, Swim, Fly (No. 1) (Jim Henson's Animal Show)
126 - We’re Different (No. 1) (Jim Henson's Animal Show)
127 - Sherlock Silbert (Johnson and Friends)
128 - Tears (Rimba's Island)
129 - The Band (Johnson and Friends)
130 - Gadzooky (Jim Henson's Animal Show)
131 - Yummy Food (Jim Henson's Animal Show)
132 - It’s Your Birthday (Johnson and Friends)
133 - Kings and Queens (Rimba's Island)
134 - The Ghost (Johnson and Friends)
135 - Abra Can Cram (Jim Henson's Animal Show)
136 - Friends (No. 2) (Jim Henson's Animal Show)
137 - Castle (Johnson and Friends)
138 - Safety (Rimba's Island)
139 - Nature Scout (Johnson and Friends)
140 - Listen to the Animals (No. 1) (Jim Henson's Animal Show)
141 - So Sorry (Jim Henson's Animal Show)
142 - Make Believe (No. 2) (Johnson and Friends)
143 - Lost (Rimba's Island)
144 - Mail Order (Johnson and Friends)
145 - Home is the Place to Be (Jim Henson's Animal Show)
146 - Cock-a-Doodle-Doo (Jim Henson's Animal Show)
147 - We’re Different (No. 2) (Johnson and Friends)
148 - Checkers (Rimba's Island)
149 - Share, Share, Share (No. 1) (Johnson and Friends)
150 - The Seashell (Jim Henson's Animal Show)
151 - Yummy Food (No. 2) (Jim Henson's Animal Show)
152 - We Are All the Colors of the Rainbow (Johnson and Friends)
153 - Why? (Rimba's Island)
154 - Complicated (Johnson and Friends)
155 - Be Careful (Jim Henson's Animal Show)
156 - Twinkle, Twinkle (Jim Henson's Animal Show)
157 - Let’s Get Some Sleep (No. 2) (Johnson and Friends)
158 - The King (Rimba's Island)
159 - Tuxedo (Johnson and Friends)
160 - Mail (Jim Henson's Animal Show)
161 - Listen to the Animals (No. 2) (Jim Henson's Animal Show)
162 - The Hop (Johnson and Friends)
163 - Hugs (Rimba's Island)
164 - Together, We Can Do Anything (No. 2) (Johnson and Friends)
165 - Colors (Jim Henson's Animal Show)
166 - Hop, Swim, Fly (No. 2) (Rimba's Island)
167 - Exit All (Rimba's Island)
168 - Three (Rimba's Island)
169 - Friends (No. 2) (Rimba's Island)
170 - Lunchtime (Rimba's Island)
171 - Bugs (Rimba's Island)
172 - The Club (Rimba's Island)
173 - Share (Rimba's Island)
174 - Food (Rimba's Island)
175 - Silbert’s Dinner (Rimba's Island)
176 - I Need a Little Help (No. 2) (Rimba's Island)
177 - Secret Plot (Rimba's Island)
178 - Alone (Rimba's Island)

Season two (incomplete)
201 - No Pouncing in the House
202 - Small Packages
203 - Go Fly a Kite
204 - A Worm in the Hand
205 - Fearless Freddie and the Fruit Bat
206 - Up a Tree
207 - Nor a Borrower Be
208 - Tummy Trouble
209 - Tongue in Cheek
210 - To Share or Not to Share
211 - Beat the Heat
212 - My Brilliant Disguise
213 - A Nice Piece of Fruit
214 - Waiting for Sunny
215 - Sssizzzling Sssnakes!
216 - Migration
217 - Crying Wolf/Being Good
218 - Hurricane Freddie
219 - Finishing What You Start
220 - Froggy Do, Froggy Be
221 - Where Rhinos Fear to Tread
222 - Silly Sharing
223 - A Fine Day for Croquet
224 - Eyes Are the Windows
225 - Spice of Life
226 - Dinosaur Tracks/Melissa’s Dinosaur
227 - If it Quacks Like a Duck
228 - A Tree in the House
229 - Remembering
230 - A Tattle Tale
231 - Ferocious
232 - Masquerade/Charade
233 - The Big Win
234 - A Song for Babs
235 - The Groups We Live In
236 - A Letter a Day
237 - Good-Bye Dolly
238 - If I Were a Fish
239 - Beauty and the Beasts
240 - Playing and Creating
241 - A Cake for Freddie
242 - Waiting for a Friend
243 - Sleepy Dreamy
244 - Dessert in the Desert
245 - Hard to Wait
246 - A Tiki Tea for Three
247 - Iron Freddie
248 - Houses for Foxes
249 - The Baby-Sitters Club
250 - How I Love Ya’, Sunny
251 - Freddie’s Mess
252 - Heads or Tails
253 - Playing Pretend
254 - Right and Left
255 - Try, Try and Try Again
256 - Freddie Needs a Nap
257 - Every Part’s Important
258 - Food for Mel
259 - The Purple is Always Greener
260 - Share
261 - Getting Along
262 - Scaredy Cat
263 - Piles o’ Paper
264 - Rimba’s Day
265 - Bill Needs a Vacation
266 - Imagine
267 - We Are Family
268 - Where’s Bill?
269 - The Big Surprise/Finders Keepers
270 - Diesel’s Taxi/The Train Conductor
271 - The Burning Bundt
272 - Runaway Rubadub
273 - Telephone
274 - Holey Pockets, Batman
275 - Be a Clown
276 - And the Leader is…
277 - Fracula
278 - The Big Scoop
279 - Rock and Roll Freddie
280 - Who’s Afraid of the Big Bad Wolf?
281 - Life is Like an Ice Cream Bar
282 - The Balloonatic
283 - Sail Away
284 - The Swap
285 - Grape-Berry Picnic
286 - The Thinker
287 - Billy the Kid
288 - Cry Wolf
289 - Hot and Colder
290 - Chicken Pox
291 - Digging for the Truth
292 - The Tin Star
293 - Apple Pie
294 - Fore!
295 - Message in a Bottle
296 - Hypnotic
297 - Froudini
298 - Babaloo Bongos
299 - Moondance
2100 - Treasure Hunt
2101 - Bugs and Boats on the Bottom
2102 - I Found It
2103 - No Drum Roll, Please
2104 - Baby Blues
2105 - Mr. Pillow
2106 - Merry Christmas
2107 - Footnotes
2108 - Auld Lang Freddie
2109 - Garden Gifts
2110 - Freddie the Flop
2111 - I Can See Clearly
2112 - Start to Finish
2113 - The Secret
2114 - Birthday Party
2115 - Case of the Chopped Greens
2116 - Dental Appointment
2117 - Fun is Where the Fox is
2118 - Strong Man Freddie
2119 - Something in the Way He Moves
2120 - Superfox
2121 - The Actor’s Life
2122 - All the Marbles
2123 - For Art’s Sake
2124 - Behind the Fence
2125 - Our Friend, the Wind
2126 - The Big Ball
2127 - Polka Dot Elephants
2128 - All the Way to China
2129 - Lost Marbles
2130 - Talent Show
2131 - My Fine-Beaked Friends
2132 - Speak for Yourself, Ookii
2133 - Families
2134 - Showdown at the OK Cubhouse
2135 - Warning!
2136 - Luck
2137 - Home is Where the Hole is
2138 - The Lucky Penny
2139 - Where Unicorns Roam
2140 - Mine, All Mine!
2141 - My Darling Clementine
2142 - A Blue Ribbon Day

External links
 

Fox Kids
1990s American anthology television series
1990s American children's television series
1994 American television series debuts
1996 American television series endings
1990s preschool education television series
American preschool education television series
American television series with live action and animation
American television shows featuring puppetry
English-language television shows